Jacobi Robinson (born 31 December 1984) is a Bermudian cricketer. He is a right-handed batsman and a right-arm medium-fast bowler. He has played one first-class match for Bermuda to date, against Canada in the 2005 ICC Intercontinental Cup.

In April 2018, he was named in Bermuda's squad for the 2018 ICC World Cricket League Division Four tournament in Malaysia.

References

External links
Cricket Archive profile
Cricinfo profile

1984 births
Living people
Bermudian cricketers
Bermuda One Day International cricketers